Mauro Corsi (1595–1680) was a Roman Catholic prelate who served as Bishop of San Miniato (1662–1680).

Biography
Mauro Corsi was born in Pecciolo, Italy on 10 Mar 1595 and ordained a priest on 23 Mar 1619.
On 31 Jul 1662, he was appointed during the papacy of Pope Alexander VII as Bishop of San Miniato.
He served as Bishop of San Miniato until his death on 30 Dec 1680.

References

External links and additional sources
 (for Chronology of Bishops) 
 (for Chronology of Bishops)  

17th-century Italian Roman Catholic bishops
Bishops appointed by Pope Alexander VII
1595 births
1680 deaths